was one of 18 s built for the Imperial Japanese Navy (IJN) during the final stages of World War II. Completed in late 1944, the ship was assigned to convoy escort duties in January 1945. After escorting one convoy to southern China, she joined two other destroyers tasked to evacuate Japanese airmen from the Philippines. En route the ships were attacked by American bombers that badly damaged Kaede. The ship returned to Japan for repairs and was inactive for the rest of the war. She was surrendered to the Allies at the end of the war and used to repatriate Japanese troops until 1947. Mid-year the destroyer was turned over to the Republic of China; renamed Heng Yang she became a training ship and remained in service until the 1960s when she was scrapped.

Design and description
Designed for ease of production, the Matsu class was smaller, slower and more lightly armed than previous destroyers as the IJN intended them for second-line duties like escorting convoys, releasing the larger ships for missions with the fleet. Their crew numbered 210 officers and enlisted men. The ships had two Kampon geared steam turbines, each driving one propeller shaft, using steam provided by two Kampon water-tube boilers.

The main armament of the Matsu-class ships consisted of three  Type 89 dual-purpose guns in one twin-gun mount aft and one single mount forward of the superstructure. The single mount was partially protected against spray by a gun shield. The accuracy of the Type 89 guns was severely reduced against aircraft because no high-angle gunnery director was fitted. The ships carried a total of twenty-five  Type 96 anti-aircraft guns in 4 triple and 13 single mounts. The Matsus were equipped with Type 13 early-warning and Type 22 surface-search radars. The ships were also armed with a single rotating quadruple mount amidships for  torpedoes. They could deliver their 36 depth charges via two stern rails and two throwers.

Construction and career
Authorized in the late 1942 Modified 5th Naval Armaments Supplement Program, Kaede (maple) was laid down on 4 March 1944 at the Yokosuka Naval Arsenal and launched on 25 July. Upon her completion on 30 October, Kaede was assigned to Destroyer Squadron 11 of the Combined Fleet for training. At the completion of training on 20 January 1945, the ship was assigned to Destroyer Division 52, part of Escort Squadron 31. On 22–27 January, she escorted a convoy from Moji to Hong Kong and then sailed to Takao (modern Kaohsiung), Taiwan. There Kaede joined her sister  and the destroyer  on a voyage to the Aparri area of the island of Luzon in the Philippines to evacuate stranded aircrew on 30 January. The following day the ships were attacked by North American B-25 bombers of the 822d Bombardment Squadron which damaged all three ships. Kaede was set on fire and badly damaged by a bomb hit that killed forty men and injured thirty. She returned to Takao for emergency repairs that were not finished until 21 February when she steamed to Kure for permanent repairs.

The ship was turned over to Allied forces at Kure at the time of the surrender of Japan on 2 September and was stricken from the navy list on 5 October. The destroyer was disarmed and used to repatriate Japanese personnel in 1945–1947 after repairs. Kaede was turned over to the Republic of China Navy on 6 July of the latter year and was renamed Heng Yang. Never rearmed or recommissioned, the ship was hulked and was classified as a training ship on 1 October 1949. She was stricken in 1960 and scrapped two years later.

Notes

Bibliography

 

 
 

Matsu-class destroyers
Ships built by Yokosuka Naval Arsenal
World War II destroyers of Japan
1944 ships
Destroyers of the Republic of China Navy